John Gregorek (born 15 April 1960) is an American former middle-distance runner who competed in the Summer Olympics in 1980 (boycotted) and 1984. His son, John Gregorek Jr., is also a competitive middle-distance runner, who competed in the 2017 World Championships.

Running career

High school
Gregorek attended St. Anthony's High School, for which he competed in cross country and track. By the time he graduated high school, he was the fastest high school runner in the United States in 1978, posting times of 4:05.4 in the mile and 8:50.7 in two miles.

Collegiate
Gregorek attended Georgetown on an athletic scholarship. In his sophomore year he made the US Olympic team as a 3000-m steeplechaser but was unable to compete due to the 1980 Summer Olympics boycott. He did however receive one of 461 Congressional Gold Medals created especially for the spurned athletes. On April 23, 1982, Gregorek was the anchor of the Georgetown distance medley team which ended Villanova's 16-year DM streak at the Penn Relays, beating Villanova's anchor and celebrated runner Ross Donoghue by two meters.

Post-collegiate
Gregorek represented the United States at the 1987 World Championships in Athletics, ran the second heat of the 5000 meters and recorded a time of 14:01. He did not make it past the first round. In 1992, Gregorek finished third in the 1992 US Olympic Trials for the 5000 meters, but did not appear at the 1992 Summer Olympics.

Gregorek moved to Seekonk, Massachusetts, and coached the men's distance and cross country teams at Brown University for a time. He was inducted into the Suffolk Sports Hall of Fame on Long Island in the Track & Field Category with the Class of 2015.

References

1960 births
Living people
American male middle-distance runners
American male steeplechase runners
Georgetown Hoyas men's track and field athletes
Olympic track and field athletes of the United States
Athletes (track and field) at the 1984 Summer Olympics
Track and field athletes from New York (state)
Congressional Gold Medal recipients
Universiade medalists in athletics (track and field)
People from Seekonk, Massachusetts
Brown Bears cross country coaches
Brown Bears track and field coaches
Universiade gold medalists for the United States
Medalists at the 1981 Summer Universiade